Oreoluwa is a Nigerian feminine given name with Yoruba origins, meaning "a gift from God". Notable people with the given name include:

Oreoluwa Cherebin (born 1997), Grenadian swimmer
Oreoluwa Lesi, Nigerian social entrepreneur, economist, and information technology expert 
Modupe-Oreoluwa Ola (born 1990), better known by her stage name Mo'Cheddah, Nigerian rapper and singer

Feminine given names